José Ramiro Pellecer Samayoa (10 October 1929 – 14 March 2022) was a Guatemalan Roman Catholic auxiliary bishop.

Pellecer Samayoa was born in Guatemala and was ordained to the priesthood in 1954. He served as titular bishop of Teglata in Proconsuan and as auxiliary bishop of the Roman Catholic Archdiocese of Guatemala, Guateamala, from 1968 until his retirement in 2010. He also served as apostolic administrator of the Roman Catholic Diocese of Escuintla, Guatemala from 1982 to 1986.

References

1929 births
2022 deaths
20th-century Roman Catholic bishops in Guatemala
21st-century Roman Catholic bishops in Guatemala
People from Escuintla Department